Hispania, la leyenda is a Spanish adventure drama television series starring Roberto Enríquez, Lluís Homar, Ana de Armas, Juan José Ballesta, Jesús Olmedo, Manuela Vellés and Nathalie Poza, among others. Set in the 2nd century BC in the Iberian Peninsula, it consists of a retelling of the myth around Lusitanian leader Viriathus and his resistance against Roman conquest efforts. Produced by Bambú Producciones, it aired on Antena 3 from 2010 to 2012.

Premise 
The plot consists of the retelling of the Viriatus' resistance against the Romans during the conquest of the Iberian Peninsula in the 2nd century BC. The struggle of Viriatus (Roberto Enríquez), a humble and courageous shepherd, pits him against the Roman praetor Servius Sulpicius Galba (Lluís Homar).

Cast

Production and release 
The series was created by Ramón Campos and produced by Bambú Producciones. Filming started in the northern hemisphere Summer of 2010 in La Vera, Extremadura. The 9-episode first season premiered on 25 October 2010 in prime time on Antena 3, running until 11 January 2011. The first season earned "great" viewership figures, averaging a 22.8% share. The second season aired from 10 May to 28 June 2011, whereas the third and last season (featuring 3 episodes) aired from 11 June to 25 June 2012. Along its broadcasting run, the series drew a steadily waning interest in terms of viewers, closing the series with a season finale attracting roughly 2 million viewers and a 12% share.

The series sparked a spin-off, Imperium, aired in 2012.

Historical licenses 
Several gross departures from historical plausibility in the fiction have been described, including the "unfortunate" onomastics chosen for the rebels, featuring Roman, Greek or even Persian names, or the notion of the inhabitants of the Iberian Peninsula sharing a sort of common "patriotic consciousness" describing themselves collectively as "Hispanos" , when rather tribal societies with different languages existed at the time. Likewise, the series moves the association of the myth of Viriathus from the Lusitanian space to a "more fluid" Iberian space.
Hence, in the light of a number of historical inacuraccies and the problematic nature of the recreated imaginaries, Elena Cueto Asín and David R. George argue that "Hispania, la leyenda crosses the boundaries of what is dramatically permissible in historical fiction".

According to Fernando Gil González, the series, based on "the old 'Schultenian' precepts of nationalist and romantic nature", "is an outdated soap opera based on out-of-context anachronistic events and falsified data about the figure of Viriato".

Accolades 

|-
| align = "center" | 2011 || 61st Fotogramas de Plata || Best TV Actor || Lluís Homar ||  || 
|-
| align = "center" | 2012 || 14th Iris Awards || Best Actor || Lluís Homar ||  || 
|-
| align = "center" | 2013 || 22nd Actors and Actresses Union Awards || Best Television Actor in a Leading Role || Roberto Enríquez ||  || 
|}

References 
Citations

Bibliography

External links 

2010 Spanish television series debuts
2012 Spanish television series endings
Television shows filmed in Spain
Antena 3 (Spanish TV channel) network series
Spanish adventure television series
2010s Spanish drama television series
Television shows set in Europe
Television series set in the 2nd century BC
Television series by Bambú Producciones